Adobe After Effects is a digital visual effects, motion graphics, and compositing application developed by Adobe Inc., and used in the post-production process of film making, video games and television production. Among other things, After Effects can be used for keying, tracking, compositing, and animation. It also functions as a very basic non-linear editor, audio editor, and media transcoder. In 2019, the program won an Academy Award for scientific and technical achievement.

History
After Effects was originally created by David Herbstman, David Simons, Daniel Wilk, David M. Cotter, and Russell Belfer at the Company of Science and Art in Providence, Rhode Island, where the first two versions of the software, 1.0 (January 1993) and 1.1, were released by the company. CoSA, whose CEO was William J. O'Farrell, along with After Effects was then acquired by Aldus Corporation in July 1993, which was in turn acquired by Adobe in 1994, and with it PageMaker. Adobe's first new release of After Effects was version 3.0.

The following is the list of versions of After Effects over the years, including the first two versions released by CoSA.

Third-party Plug-ins, Scripts, and Extensions

After Effects functionality can be extended through a variety of third-party integrations, the most common integrations are: plug-ins, scripts, and extensions.

After Effects Plug-ins

Plug-ins are predominantly written in C or C++ and extend the functionality of After Effects, allowing for more advanced features such as particle systems, physics engines, 3D effects, and the ability to bridge the gap between After Effects and another application.

After Effects Scripts

After Effects Scripts are a series of commands written in both JavaScript and the ExtendScript language.

After Effects Scripts, unlike plug-ins, can only access the core functionality of After Effects.
Scripts are often developed to automate repetitive tasks, to simplify complex After Effects features, or to perform complex calculations that would otherwise take a long time to complete.

Scripts can also use some functionality not directly exposed through the graphical user interface.

After Effects Extensions

After Effects Extensions offer the ability to extend After Effects functionality through modern web development technologies like HTML5, and Node.js, without the need for C++.

After Effects Extensions make use of Adobe's Common Extensibility Platform or CEP Panels, which means they can be built to interact with other Adobe CC apps.

Similar products
 Nuke – The Foundry
 Flame – Autodesk
 Motion – Apple Inc.
 VSDC Free Video Editor
 Boris RED – Boris FX
 Natron

While not dedicated to compositing, the open source software Blender contains a limited node-based compositing feature which, among other things is capable of basic keying and blurring effects.

See also
 Lottie (file format), a standard for the JSON export of an After Effects animation.

References

External links

After Effects
After Effects
Video editing software
Compositing software
Visual effects software
Animation software
Aldus software
1993 software